Jan Vaněk (born 25 January 1979) is a Paralympian athlete from Czech Republic competing mainly in category F51 club throw events.

He competed in the 2008 Summer Paralympics in Beijing, China. There he won a bronze medal in the men's F32/51 club throw event.

External links
 
 Dalších pět medailí pro českou výpravu at iSport.cz

Paralympic athletes of the Czech Republic
Athletes (track and field) at the 2008 Summer Paralympics
Paralympic bronze medalists for the Czech Republic
Club throwers
Living people
1979 births
Medalists at the 2008 Summer Paralympics
Paralympic medalists in athletics (track and field)
20th-century Czech people
21st-century Czech people